Georgios Zisopoulos (born 23 May 1984) is a Greek former professional footballer who played as a defensive midfielder.

Career
Born in Katerini, Zisopoulos began playing football for PAOK, signing a professional contract in December 2004. On 22 May 2004, he made his debut in the Superleague Greece as a late substitute in an away game against rivals Aris. He would only make 18 league appearances for the club before moving to Levadiakos in August 2005. He stayed in the club for five consecutive years, before he joined Greek second division side Panthrakikos in August 2010. He returned to Levadiakos F.C. after a year playing for two years in Super League. On 11 June 2013 Zisopoulos signed for Asteras Tripoli. On 21 August 2014, he scored his first goal in international competition in a 2-0 home win against Maccabi Tel Aviv for the 1st leg qualification round of UEFA Europa League. According to a Greek newspaper, Israeli, Belgian and Turkish clubs are interested in signing the defensive midfielder and Israeli Premier League club Hapoel Be'er Sheva have made an official transfer offer, but he seems not willing to continue his career at Israel.

On 23 April 2016, he did not renew his contract with the club, seeking for his next destination in his career. On 14 June 2016, he signed a two years' contract with Atromitos for an undisclosed fee.

References

External links
 Guardian Football 
Profile at epae.org

1984 births
Living people
Greek footballers
Super League Greece players
PAOK FC players
Levadiakos F.C. players
Panthrakikos F.C. players
Asteras Tripolis F.C. players
Atromitos F.C. players
Association football midfielders
Footballers from Katerini